Duncan Huisman (born 11 November 1971 in Doornspijk, Gelderland) is a Dutch racing driver. He won the Guia Race four times and the 24 Hours of Nürburgring in 2005. He claimed three titles at the Dutch Touring Car Championship in 1997, 2000 and 2002, and resulted runner-up at the 2010 and 2011 Dutch GT4 Championship. He has also competed in the FIA GT Championship and the Porsche Supercup. His older brother Patrick is also a successful racing driver.

Touring car racing
He is three times Dutch Touring Car Champion, having won the title in 1997, 2000 and 2001 in a BMW 3 Series.

Between 2001 and 2004 he drove in the European Touring Car Championship, before it was renamed the World Touring Car Championship. In 2005 he first drove in the WTCC for the final two rounds with BMW Team UK, winning in what was only his second race. He competed for just over half a season in 2006 for BMW Team Italy/Spain finishing the season thirteenth overall. 
Duncan drove for the WSR-managed Team Aviva in the WTCC event in Macau at the end of 2007 prompting speculation that he will join Team RAC in the 2008 British Touring Car Championship (BTCC) alongside Colin Turkington following the departure of Tom Onslow-Cole to Vauxhall's VXR Racing. Stephen Jelley was Onslow-Coles replacement, and Huisman returned again for just two 2008 WTCC rounds at Oschersleben for Wiechers-Sport in a BMW 320si.

Racing record

Complete World Touring Car Championship results
(key) (Races in bold indicate pole position) (Races in italics indicate fastest lap)

Complete GT1 World Championship results

References

External links
 
 

1971 births
Living people
People from Elburg
Dutch racing drivers
World Touring Car Championship drivers
FIA GT Championship drivers
FIA GT1 World Championship drivers
Porsche Supercup drivers
ADAC GT Masters drivers
WeatherTech SportsCar Championship drivers
24 Hours of Spa drivers
European Touring Car Championship drivers
24H Series drivers
BMW M drivers
Racing Bart Mampaey drivers
Sportspeople from Gelderland
Schnitzer Motorsport drivers
Nürburgring 24 Hours drivers
GT4 European Series drivers
Porsche Carrera Cup Germany drivers